FK Indeks is a Serbian football club based in Novi Sad, Serbia. Their football stadium "Đačko igralište" is located in the Liman neighborhood in the city centre.

References 

Indeks Novi Sad
Indeks